The Melrose Woman's Club (also known as The Literary and Debating Society or The Hall) is a historic woman's club in Melrose, Florida. It is located at Pine Street. On April 6, 1978, it was added to the U.S. National Register of Historic Places.

See also
List of Registered Historic Woman's Clubhouses in Florida

References

External links
 Putnam County listings at National Register of Historic Places
 Florida's Office of Cultural and Historical Programs
 Putnam County listings
 Putnam County markers
 Melrose Historical Trail at Historic Hiking Trails

National Register of Historic Places in Putnam County, Florida
Women's clubs in Florida
Women's club buildings in Florida